Gayle Friesen (born September 18, 1960) is a Canadian author of young adult novels. She was raised in Chilliwack, British Columbia. She has a B.A. from the University of British Columbia. She is married with two children.

Friesen's first novel Janey's Girl (1998) was critically acclaimed, winning the Canadian Library Association's Young Adult Book Award and the Red Maple Reading Award. It was also nominated for the Governor General's Literary Award. She has written four other novels for young adults.

Bibliography 
Janey's Girl (1998)
Men of Stone (2000)
Losing Forever (2002)
The Isabel Factor (2005)
For Now (2007)
''The Valley (2008)

References

External links 

 

1960 births
Canadian children's writers
Canadian women novelists
People from Chilliwack
Canadian women children's writers
Living people
Canadian Mennonites
Mennonite writers